WEDB (98.1 FM) is a radio station broadcasting a hot adult contemporary format. Licensed to East Dublin, Georgia, United States, the station is currently owned by Radiojones, LLC.

History
The station went on the air as WJAT-FM on 1978-11-29.  On 1985-04-15, the station changed its call sign to WGKS, on 1988-03-28 to WJAT-FM, on 1999-04-16 to WELT, and on 2008-08-27 to the current WEDB

References

External links
WEDB Station website

EDB